Haunted or The Haunted may refer to:

Books
 Haunted (Armstrong novel), by Kelley Armstrong, 2005
 Haunted (Cabot novel), by Meg Cabot, 2004
 Haunted (Palahniuk novel), by Chuck Palahniuk, 2005
 Haunted (Angel novel), a 2002 novel based on the television series Angel
 Haunted (The Hardy Boys), a 2008 novel featuring The Hardy Boys in the Undercover Brothers series
 Haunted, a 1988 novel by James Herbert
 Haunted, a 1990 novel in the Fear Street series by R.L. Stine
 Haunted: Tales of the Grotesque, a 1994 short-story collection by Joyce Carol Oates

Comics
 Haunted (Buffy comic), an anthology of comics based on the television series Buffy the Vampire Slayer
 Haunted (comics), a horror-suspense anthology comic book series

Film
 Haunted (1977 film), an American film starring Aldo Ray
 The Haunted (1991 film), an American made-for-TV film directed by Robert Mandel
 Haunted (1995 film), a UK film starring Aidan Quinn and Kate Beckinsale
 Haunted (2007 film), a Turkish film directed by Alper Mestçi
 Haunted – 3D, a 2011 Hindi film directed by Vikram Bhatt

Television
 Haunted (British TV series), a 1960s supernatural drama series
 Haunted (2002 TV series), an American supernatural drama series
 Haunted (2018 TV series), an American paranormal docudrama series
 The Haunted (American TV series), a 2009 American paranormal docudrama series
 The Haunted (Philippine TV series), a 2019 Philippine horror drama series

Episodes
 "Haunted" (Arrow)
 "Haunted" (Criminal Minds)
 "Haunted" (Dead Like Me)
 "Haunted" (Dollhouse)
 "Haunted" (Highlander)
 "Haunted" (Law & Order: Special Victims Unit)
 "Haunted" (Sanctuary)
 "Haunted" (Tru Calling)
 "Haunted" (The Vampire Diaries)

Theatre
 Haunted, a 2009 play by Jon Claydon and Tim Lawler that starred Jessie Wallace
 Haunted, a 2009 play by Edna O'Brien

Music

Performers
 The Haunted (Swedish band), a Swedish metal band
 The Haunted (Canadian band), a 1960s Canadian garage rock band

Albums
 Haunted (Janita album), or the title song, 2010
 Haunted (Late Night Alumni album), 2011
 Haunted (Poe album), or the title song, 2000
 Haunted (Six Feet Under album), or the title song, 1995
 The Haunted (album), by the Swedish band The Haunted, 1998
 Haunted (EP), by Lalaine, or the title song, 2004

Songs
 "Haunted" (Beyoncé song), 2013
 "Haunted" (Human Nature song), 2004, also covered by Room 2012 in 2007
 "Haunted" (The Pogues song), 1986
 "Haunted", by Annihilator from Metal
 "Haunted", by Charlotte Martin from On Your Shore
 "Haunted", by Deep Purple from Bananas
 "Haunted", by Diamante
 "Haunted", by Disturbed from Indestructible
 "Haunted", by Dusty Springfield from A Brand New Me (1992 reissue)
 "Haunted", by Evanescence from Fallen
 "Haunted", by Gary Numan from Jagged
 "Haunted", by Go West from Go West
 "Haunted", by Jewel from 0304
 "Haunted", by Kelly Clarkson from My December
 "Haunted", by The Moody Blues on their album Strange Times
 "Haunted", by Paul van Dyk from In Between
 "Haunted", by Rihanna from Good Girl Gone Bad
 "Haunted", by Stream of Passion from Embrace the Storm
 "Haunted", by Taylor Swift from Speak Now
 "Haunted", by Type O Negative from October Rust
 "The Haunted", by Memphis May Fire from The Hollow

Video games
 Haunted, a video game from Deck13 Interactive

See also
 Haunt (disambiguation)
 Haunted attraction (simulated)
 Haunted house, a building believed to be a centre for supernatural occurrences
 Haunted house (disambiguation)
 List of haunted paintings, works of art described as being haunted or cursed
 List of reportedly haunted locations, sites of reported ghostly activity
 Haunts (disambiguation)
 Haunter (disambiguation)
 The Haunting (disambiguation)
 Ghostlore